Pedro Castillo (1790·1858), Venezuelan painter.

Pedro Castillo (born 1969) former president of Peru.

Pedro Castillo can also refer to:

Pedro del Castillo (1521–1569), a Spanish conquistador
a Guatemalan executed for child murder, see Roberto Girón and Pedro Castillo